Pushkin Airport  is an airport in Leningrad Oblast, Russia located 28 km south of Saint Petersburg. It handles small airliners.  It was home to 147 OVZ RZB regiment flying Mil Mi-8 helicopters and contains Ilyushin Il-18, Ilyushin Il-22, and Ilyushin Il-38 aircraft.

The base is home to the 332nd Guards Independent Helicopter Regiment as part of the 6th Air and Air Defence Forces Army.

See also
1981 Pushkin Tu-104 crash

References

External links
RussianAirFields.com

Soviet Air Force bases
Russian Air Force bases
Airports built in the Soviet Union
Airports in Leningrad Oblast